Shah Reza Gavzan Mahalleh (also Romanized as Shāh Rez̤ā Gāvzan Maḩalleh) is a village in Babol Kenar Rural District, Babol Kenar District, Babol County, Mazandaran Province, Iran. At the 2006 census, its population was 542, in 137 families.

References 

Populated places in Babol County